The BD is an automotive diesel engine produced by Nissan Diesel. BD is specified as a 4-cylinder, direct fuel injection, water-cooled naturally aspirated engine.

BD25
 
  @ 4,300 rpm
 It is applied to the following vehicles
 Nissan D21 Pickup, Nissan Atlas
 In the Philippines BD25 Diesel engines are mounted on pickup trucks, namely the Ultra Power, and the Eagle series.

BD30
 
  @ 3,800 rpm,  @ 2,000 rpm
 It is applied to the following vehicles
 Nissan Atlas series H40 and H41 (1995 only)
 BMC Levend (1990-2009)
 Nissan Motors and BMC (Turkey) for light trucks.

BD30TI 
  or 
 It is applied to the following vehicles
 1997-2007 Nissan Cabstar F23

BD30TI 
 It is applied to the following vehicles
 1997-2000 Nissan ECO-T Atleon (Spain)
 It is applied to the following vehicles
 2000-2006 Nissan Atleon (Spain)

See also
 List of Nissan engines

Bd
Diesel engines by model
Straight-four engines